Cape Town & District Gas, Light & Coke Co, Ltd v Director of Valuations is an important case in South African law. It was heard in the Cape Provincial Division by De Villiers JP and Searle J on August 5, 1949, with judgment on August 30. P. Charles appeared for the appellant and HG Lawrence KC for the respondent.

Facts 
In 1903, the appellant company had built, on a concrete foundation sunk four feet below surface level, a heavy steel structure for the purpose

 of storing gas generated in a building some distance from it; and
 of supplying such gas for consumption to the public.

The gas holder was not affixed to the soil by any mechanical means; its affixation was entirely due to its sheer weight resting upon the concrete foundation. It appeared that the company intended using it as long as it continued to function efficiently.

Judgment 
In an appeal under section 67 of Ordinance 26 of 1944 (Cape), the court held that the gasometer was immovable property. The court held further that it was a "structural improvement" within section 45(h) of the Ordinance, although quaere whether the structure was also a "building" within the meaning of sub-section (b) of section 45.

See also 
 Law of South Africa
 South African property law

References

Case law 
 Cape Town & District Gas, Light & Coke Co, Ltd v Director of Valuations 1949 (4) SA 197 (C).

Notes 

1949 in South African law
1949 in case law
Western Cape Division cases